Pyper America Holder (née Smith; born March 13, 1997) is an American model, actress, and musician. She is the bassist in an alternative rock band called The Atomics.

Early life
Pyper America was raised in Utah by a family who were members of the Church of Jesus Christ of Latter-day Saints. Her parents are Sheridan and Dallon Smith, a former model and a guitar string entrepreneur. Third of four children, her siblings are also models and musicians: two older sisters Cheyenne Starlie (born 1993), Daisy Clementine (born 1996), and a younger brother Lucky Blue (born 1998).

She also lived in Montana and California. At the age of 16, she moved with her family from Utah to Los Angeles, California, where she described experiencing culture shock.

Career
On the runway she has walked for Giorgio Armani, Dolce & Gabbana, Cushnie et Ochs, Philipp Plein, Moschino, and Ermanno Scervino.

In advertisements, she has modeled for Moncler, Calvin Klein, and H&M alongside her siblings; as well as Forever 21 and Tiffany and Co.

She has appeared in the magazines L'Officiel, Vogue España, Seventeen, Vogue Ukraine, Allure, Love, W, and Elle among others.

With Superga, she designed a shoe line for spring 2017.

As a devout Latter-day Saint, she has chosen to not pose nude.

Personal life
During 2016 and 2017, Pyper America dated Brandon Thomas Lee, son of Tommy Lee and Pamela Anderson.

In late 2017, she started dating Australian Quaid Rippon Holder. They got engaged on November 23, 2018.

References 

1997 births
Living people
People from Spanish Fork, Utah
Female models from Utah
Alternative rock bass guitarists
American rock bass guitarists
Women bass guitarists
Guitarists from Utah
Latter Day Saints from Utah
21st-century American bass guitarists
21st-century American women musicians